John Stuart Wheeler (30 January 193523 July 2020) was a British financier, gambler and political activist. He made his fortune as the founder of the spread betting firm IG Index in 1974, but was best known for his political activism, being a major donor to the Conservative Party and treasurer of the UK Independence Party from 2011 to 2014.

Early life and career

Wheeler was adopted just before his second birthday by an American, Alexander Wheeler, a former Army officer and heir to a banking fortune, and his young wife Betty, daughter of a baronet, Sir John Gibbons. The couple also adopted a little girl, Susan, on the same day. 

Wheeler spent his early years growing up on the Leighon Estate in Manaton, Devon.
He was educated at Eton College. He did his National Service with the Welsh Guards, before studying at Christ Church, Oxford, from where he graduated with a second-class degree in law. He practised law as a barrister, before becoming an investment banker. However, Wheeler found his niche through IG Index, which pioneered spread betting. Originally, the company was launched to allow Britons to speculate on gold, when foreign exchange controls made it exorbitantly expensive to actually buy it.

Politics

Conservative Party
Although a successful businessman, Wheeler was not a well-known figure nationally until he donated £5m to the Conservative Party during the 2001 election campaign. This was, and remains, the largest single donation ever made to a political party in the United Kingdom.

In January 2008, Wheeler brought an action against the government, represented by the Prime Minister, Gordon Brown, and the Foreign Secretary, David Miliband, over the government's process of ratification of the Treaty of Lisbon. The action sought to prevent the government from completing ratification of the treaty, on the grounds that it was illegal for a government to breach the public's legitimate expectation of adherence to manifesto and other commitments. The government, along with the Conservatives and Liberal Democrats, had pledged in their 2005 manifestos to hold a referendum on the European Constitution, which Wheeler held did not have "significant or material differences" from the Treaty of Lisbon. This action failed.

Wheeler was seen as belonging to the right wing of the Conservative Party. He supported Liam Fox in the 2005 leadership contest, and switched his support to David Davis against David Cameron in the final run-off. He was critical of the leadership of David Cameron during its first few months.

On 28 March 2009, Wheeler donated £100,000 to the UK Independence Party (UKIP) after criticising David Cameron's stance towards the Treaty of Lisbon and the European Union. He said, "If they kick me out I will understand. I will be very sorry about it but it won't alter my stance." The following day he was expelled from the Conservative Party.

The Trust Party
On 29 March 2010, Wheeler announced that he was forming a new political party to be called the Trust Party and that he would run for the Bexhill and Battle seat. The seat was won by Gregory Barker for the Conservatives, but Wheeler polled 4.9% and therefore lost his deposit. The new party also fielded a candidate in Perth and North Perthshire, where it won 1.1% of the vote.

UKIP treasurer
In 2011, Wheeler was appointed treasurer of UKIP to spearhead fundraising in advance of the 2014 European elections. His appointment was seen as a blow for the Conservatives because of his network of contacts. Party leader Nigel Farage said the move would enable the party to "raise serious money" as a lack of funds was "holding them back".

Vote Leave co-treasurer
At the launch of the Vote Leave campaign for Brexit in October 2015, Wheeler was reported to be one of the new group's three major donors, with Peter Cruddas and John Mills; the three men were appointed as joint co-treasurers.

Personal life
Wheeler was called an "obsessive" gambler, taking a keen interest in card and risk games and having played bridge with Lord Lucan on 6 November 1974, two days before his disappearance, and with Omar Sharif, as well as being a regular competitor in World Series of Poker championships.

His wife, photographer Tessa Codrington, died in 2016. They had three daughters, including model Jacquetta Wheeler.

In June 2020, Wheeler announced that he had stomach cancer with only "six months to live". He died a month later on 23 July 2020, aged 85, at Chilham Castle in Kent, his home.

Footnotes

External links

 Stuart's Wheeler's official website

1935 births
2020 deaths
20th-century English businesspeople
21st-century English businesspeople
Alumni of Christ Church, Oxford
British financial businesspeople
British investment bankers
British people of American descent
Conservative Party (UK) donors
Deaths from cancer in England
Deaths from stomach cancer
English adoptees
Members of the Freedom Association
People educated at Eton College
People educated at St. Aubyns School
UK Independence Party donors
British political party founders
Leaders of political parties in the United Kingdom